Sy Richardson is an American film and television actor. Also a two-time screenwriter, Richardson wrote the screenplay for the 1993 film Posse.

Early life and education
He was born in Cincinnati and grew up in Chicago. He attended Farragut Career Academy. He served two years in the United States Navy. He received an associate of arts in black history and music from Kennedy–King College in 1972 and received a Bachelor of Science in journalism, specializing in advertising, from the University of Colorado Boulder in 1975.

Career
Richardson made his film debut as the Fairy Godmother, in the 1977 American erotic musical comedy Cinderella. He is perhaps best known as a regular in the films of Alex Cox, having appeared in Repo Man, Sid and Nancy, Straight to Hell, Walker, The Winner and Searchers 2.0.  He played "Turbo" in the 1990 film Tripwire. He recently had a recurring role as the coroner on the TV series Pushing Daisies. He also appeared in They Live and Colors.

Filmography

Film

Television

References

External links

1941 births
Living people
Male actors from Cincinnati
American male film actors
Kennedy–King College alumni
United States Navy sailors
University of Colorado Boulder alumni
African-American male actors
Farragut Career Academy alumni
21st-century African-American people
20th-century African-American people
African-American United States Navy personnel